Lubos Pastor (born March 1974) is a Slovakian-American financial economist, currently the Charles P. McQuaid Professor of Finance and Robert King Steel Faculty Fellow at Booth School of Business, University of Chicago. He earned his Ph.D. in finance from the Wharton School at the University of Pennsylvania.

Academic work 
Pastor's research focuses on financial markets and asset management. His most cited paper, “Liquidity risk and expected stock returns” has been cited over 6,000 times according to Google Scholar. The paper introduces the concept of a liquidity risk factor and constructs the Pastor-Stambaugh liquidity factors. His other work addresses topics such as political uncertainty, stock price bubbles, technological revolutions, the size of the active management industry, and portfolio choice.

Pastor's research has been awarded numerous best paper prizes including two Smith Breeden Prizes (2003, 2012) and three Fama-DFA Prizes (2002, 2006, 2015).

Since 1 January 2021 he has been a director of the European Finance Association, and from 2016 to 2019 he was on the board of directors of the American Finance Association. He was on the board of directors of the Western Finance Association from 2010 to 2017 and served as its president from 2016 to 2017. He is a research associate with the National Bureau of Economic Research (NBER) and a research fellow with the Centre for Economic Policy Research (CEPR). Pastor has served as an associate editor of the Journal of Finance, Journal of Financial Economics, and the Review of Financial Studies.

In 2016, Pastor was awarded an honorary doctorate by the University of Economics in Bratislava.

Non-academic work 

In 2015, Pastor was appointed by the Government of the Slovak Republic to the Bank Board of the National Bank of Slovakia. In 2021, he was reappointed to serve on the Board for another term until 2027.

From 2008 to 2012, he co-designed the investable CRSP Indexes in cooperation with the Center for Research in Security Prices. In 2012, the CRSP Indexes were adopted by The Vanguard Group.

References

1974 births
Living people
University of Chicago Booth School of Business faculty
21st-century American economists
Financial economists
Wharton School of the University of Pennsylvania alumni
Comenius University alumni
People from Košice

External links
 
 Profile and Papers at Research Papers in Economics/RePEc
 Publications at the National Bureau of Economic Research
 Board Member Profile at the National Bank of Slovakia